Lawi Lalang (born June 15, 1991) is a Kenyan-American runner.

Personal life
His elder brother Boaz Kiplagat Lalang is a middle distance runner, who specialises in the 5000 metres. Lalang was drafted into the U.S. Army World Class Athlete Program on a track to becoming a U.S. citizen. He switched athletic allegiance from Kenya to the US on May 17, 2018.

Career
In college, Lalang ran for the University of Arizona. Lawi Lalang was coached by James Li of the University of Arizona, who also coaches other eminent Kenyan-American runners including Bernard Lagat. Lalang won 2011 NCAA Division I Cross Country Championships titles. In 2012, he won bronze at both the 2012 NCAA Division I Cross Country Championships and at the 2012 NCAA Division I Outdoor Track and Field Championships (5,000 m). In 2013 he won both 5,000 and 10,000 metres at the 2013 NCAA Division I Outdoor Track and Field Championships. In 2014 he took two silver medals at the 2014 NCAA Division I Indoor Track and Field Championships before finishing with a silver and a gold at the 2014 NCAA Division I Outdoor Track and Field Championships.

Representing the US in international competition, Lalang won the bronze medal in the 10,000 metres at the 2019 Pan American Games.

Personal bests
800 metres –  1:48.88
1500 metres – 3:33.20
Mile – 3:52.88
5000 metres – 13:00.95 
10,000 metres – 28:14.63

References

1991 births
Living people
Kenyan male middle-distance runners
Kenyan male long-distance runners
Kenyan emigrants to the United States
Junior college men's track and field athletes in the United States
Arizona Wildcats men's track and field athletes
American male middle-distance runners
American male long-distance runners
Athletes (track and field) at the 2019 Pan American Games
Pan American Games bronze medalists for the United States
Pan American Games medalists in athletics (track and field)
Pan American Games track and field athletes for the United States
Medalists at the 2019 Pan American Games
U.S. Army World Class Athlete Program
People from Uasin Gishu County